The Theological University of Northern Italy is a university of the Catholic Church, and has its main campus in Milan. The administration of the University, which is also located in Milan, in the monastery annexed to the Basilica of St Simplician, is under the leadership of the Bishops of four ecclesiastical regions: Piedmont, Lombardy, Venice, and Liguria. Liguria joined the other three regions recently.

Description

The Turin Campus is the Piedmont branch of the Theological University of Northern Italy. It offers academic degrees completely similar to those available in the Milan Campus, and in the other regions. Instead, the Master Program in Moral Theology is offered only in the Turin Campus, on behalf of all the affiliates of the Theological University.

The main building of the Turin Campus is the Palace of the Seminary located at 83, XX Settembre Street, close by the Cathedral of Turin, in the downtown area.

The Theological University–Turin Campus offers a B.A. and a M.A. programs.
 The B.A. is a five-year program which leads to the bachelor's degree of Theology.
 The M.A. program is a two-year program with specialization in Moral Theology, social emphasis. A Master's degree of Theology (or “License’’) is conferred at the conclusion of the studies.

The Theological University of Northern Italy–Turin Campus is also in charge of the supervision of the courses offered at the Higher Institute of Religious Sciences, that is also located in the same building

List of Faculty Members

B.A. in Theology

M.A. in Moral Theology

See also
 Archdiocese of Turin

References

External links
 Turin Campus official website
 Central Administration in Milan official website

Catholic Church in Italy
Pontifical universities
Universities in Italy
Education in Turin
Buildings and structures in Turin
Educational institutions established in 1982
Catholic universities and colleges in Italy
Seminaries and theological colleges in Italy
Universities in Piedmont
1982 establishments in Italy